Salomonia is a genus of plants in the family Polygalaceae, the milkwort family.

Species include:
Salomonia cantoniensis Lour.
Salomonia ciliata (L.) DC.
Salomonia kradungensis H.Koyama
Salomonia longiciliata Kurz
Salomonia thailandica H.Koyama

References

Polygalaceae
Fabales genera